Lorenda Starfelt (January 11, 1955 – March 16, 2011) was an independent film producer, as well as a committed political activist and blogger who notably dug up president Barack Obama's birth announcement in an August 1961 edition of The Honolulu Advertiser while researching her documentary on the 2008 presidential election, The Audacity of Democracy.

Background
Lorenda Starfelt was born on January 11, 1955, in Belleville, Illinois. According to her website biography, she and her brother Brad Peters were raised by their mother, Phyllis Smith. During her high school years, a brief attempt was made to remove Starfelt from her mother’s care. While attending Belleville High School, Starfelt developed an interest in the theater, but circumstances prevented her from pursuing that passion until much later in life. Several years after graduation, Lorenda met and married an engineer named William Starfelt. The short-lived marriage produced a son, Graham, who remained under his mother’s care after his parents’ eventual divorce. Following a brief stay in Florida, Starfelt moved to San Francisco, where she quickly became involved in the political work of left-wing activist Tom Hayden. Starfelt and her son eventually settled in Los Angeles, where she began work as an interior designer, while maintaining an interest in politics.

Career

Lorenda (Lori) Starfelt was the producer of the independent feature film comedy The Watermelon, which  premiered at the 2008 San Diego Film Festival. Directed by Brad Mays,   The Watermelon was written by Michael Hemmingson and stars Will Beinbrink, Kiersten Morgan, Elyse Ashton, Julia Aks, Steven Shields and Mike Ivy.

In 2000, Ms. Starfelt produced, in conjunction with Turman-Morrissey Productions, an independent feature film adaptation of Euripides' The Bacchae. Her next project was an adaptation of William Shakespeare's The Merchant of Venice, entitled Shakespeare's Merchant, directed by Paul Wagar. She followed up that particular project with Schooled, a drama written & directed by Brooks Elms, which portrays the unique difficulties facing both students and teachers engaged in alternative education.  Ms. Starfelt's next film project was the documentary feature SING*ularity (2008),  which examines the cutting-edge training of student and professional-level vocalists at Ann Baltz's world-renowned OperaWorks program in Northridge, California.

In 2009, Starfelt's feature-length political documentary film The Audacity of Democracy was released. The film offered an inside view of the 2008 race for the Democratic Presidential Nomination, focusing in particular on the notorious PUMA movement. In multiple Blog-Radio interviews,<ref>[http://www.politicsdaily.com/2009/01/31/puma-movie-director-on-unusable-signal-tonight/ Politics Daily online article, written by Tommy Christopher, discussing Brad Mays' film The Audacity of Democracy]</ref> Lorenda Starfelt spoke candidly about her commitment to Hillary Clinton's presidential run, and the misogyny she personally encountered in various liberal political circles.

In addition to her film work, Ms. Starfelt also produced for the Los Angeles stage, most notably The Bacchae LA Weekly article on nudity in the Los Angeles theatre, Grin And Bare It, written by Neal Weaver - Lorenda Starfelt interviewed. in 1997 at the Complex, Marat/Sade in 2000 for the Theatre of N.O.T.E. and a multi-media production of Anthony Burgess' A Clockwork Orange which was nominated for Best Direction, Best Revival Production, and Best Actress by the 2004 LA Weekly Theater Awards. Vanessa Claire Smith won Best Actress for her gender-bending portrayal of Alex, the story's music-loving teenaged sociopath.Clockwork Orange - The Plays: online overview of stage productions of A Clockwork Orange  from around the world In a 2011 web radio interview with Priscilla Leona, Ms. Starfelt discussed a new comedy web series, Customer Diss-Service,  that she and her husband Brad Mays were currently engaged in. Stressing the need for strong scripts and experienced, well-trained actors, she asserted that working within small budgets enables creative freedom, thus affording experienced artists a change to present their work in a completely unfettered form. Starfelt also discussed a number of new projects in the works, including the musical feature film Beginning Blue, which she co-wrote. Starfelt died on March 16, 2011, after battling cancer. In 2013, the feature documentary I Grew Up in Princeton'', which Starfelt had undertaken with her husband Brad Mays before her death, had its inaugural screening in Princeton, New Jersey. The film, described in one Princeton newspaper as a "deeply personal 'coming-of-age story' that yields perspective on the role of perception in a town that was split racially, economically and sociologically", is a portrayal of life in the venerable university town during the tumultuous period of the late sixties through the early seventies.

Filmography

Notes and references

External links
 
Official Website for Schooled
Reel Grok Lorenda quote
Huffington Post Will Bower discusses The Audacity of Democracy
Turner Classic Movies (TCM) page

A Clockwork Orange Stage Production
Production Photos and other information from Lorenda Starfelt's 1997 Los Angeles production of Euripides' The Bacchae, directed by Brad Mays
Basement Angel: Lorenda Starfelt's Political Blog Page
Official Website for film "Beginning Blue"
Online obituary for Lorenda Starfelt, American Producer

Film producers from California
People from Belleville, Illinois
1955 births
2011 deaths
Businesspeople from Los Angeles
Deaths from cancer in California
American theatre managers and producers
American women film producers
Activists from California
Film producers from Illinois
20th-century American businesspeople
20th-century American businesswomen
21st-century American women